Lukavec is a market town in Pelhřimov District in the Vysočina Region of the Czech Republic. It has about 1,000 inhabitants.

Administrative parts
Villages of Bezděkov, Týmova Ves and Velká Ves are administrative parts of Lukavec.

Gallery

References

Populated places in Pelhřimov District
Market towns in the Czech Republic